Prospect Creek Airport  is a state-owned public-use airport located three nautical miles (5.5 km) northeast of Prospect Creek, in the Yukon-Koyukuk Census Area of the U.S. state of Alaska.

Facilities and aircraft 
Prospect Creek Airport has one runway designated 1/19 with a gravel surface measuring 4,968 by 150 feet (1,514 x 46 m). For the 12-month period ending July 9, 2008, the airport had 498 aircraft operations, an average of 41 per month: 51% air taxi, 44% general aviation and 5% scheduled commercial.

References

External links
 FAA Alaska airport diagram (GIF)

Airports in the Arctic
Airports in the Yukon–Koyukuk Census Area, Alaska